Joseph Alfred André Corriveau (May 15, 1928–October 1, 1993)  was a Canadian professional ice hockey forward who played three games in the National Hockey League for the Montreal Canadiens. Corriveau was born in Grand-Mère, Quebec.

References

External links
 

1928 births
1993 deaths
Canadian ice hockey forwards
Ice hockey people from Quebec
Montreal Canadiens players
Sportspeople from Shawinigan